Invitation is a 2008 Iranian drama film directed by Ebrahim Hatamikia, who also co-wrote the screenplay with Chista Yasrebi. It is a poly-layered narrative, with many celebrities in the cast.

Synopsis 
A number of different families face a similar crisis and they react according to their specific points of view. It is a Persian drama film about several couples realizing that they are going to have a baby, and each of these couples' lives play out in different episodes through the film.

The film revolves around the theme of child abortion and its main message can be interpreted as "a child who is invited to come to this world should not be aborted" even if it is from a 60 year old, widow or a concubine who likes her job more than her child, or a wandering woman in a city that is distancing herself from her plumper husband. One critic described it as "a movie about abortions in which no abortions happen".

This episode of the film which about two university students Pejman Bazeghi is eliminated after the filming which is considered due to censorship treatments, but Ebrahim Hatamikia considers it as the result of time shortages in the limited boundary for a film.

Cast and crew 
This film starrs Farhad Ghaemian, Mohammad-Reza Foroutan, Mahnaz Afshar, Katayoun Riahi, Merila Zarei, Gohar Kheirandish, Soraya Ghasemi, Reza Babak, Siamak Ansari, Majid Moshiri, Sara Khoeniha, Sahar Jafarijozani, Anahita Netami, Hoda Naseh, Negar Foroozandeh, Negin Sedaghatgooya and Mohammad-Reza Sharifinia.

Production crew includes:
Sound engineer: Mehran Malakouti
First director assistant and program planner: Alireza Shams Sharifi
Script Supervisor: Mina Zarpour
Photographer: Esmail Hatamikia
Production manager: Mohammadreza Mansouri
Special Fx: Abbas Shoghi

Release and reception 
Hatamikia chose to release the film before the Fajr International Film Festival and did not enter it into the festival.

References

External links 

2008 drama films
2008 films
2000s pregnancy films
Films about abortion
Films directed by Ebrahim Hatamikia
Iranian drama films